Xaliqabat (Karakalpak: Халықабат, Xalıqabat) is a city (qala) of Kegeyli District in Karakalpakstan in Uzbekistan. Its population was 9,186 in 1989, and 14,600 in 2016.

References

Populated places in Karakalpakstan
Cities in Uzbekistan